In phonetics and phonology, checked vowels are those that commonly stand in a stressed closed syllable; and free vowels are those that can stand in either a stressed closed syllable or a stressed open syllable.

Usage
The terms checked vowel and free vowel originated in English phonetics and phonology. They are seldom used for the description of other languages, even though a distinction between vowels that usually have to be followed by a consonant and other vowels is common in most Germanic languages.

Checked vowels is also used to refer to a kind of very short glottalized vowels found in some Zapotecan languages that contrast with laryngealized vowels. The term checked vowel is also used to refer to a short vowel followed by a glottal stop in Mixe, which has a distinction between two kinds of glottalized syllable nuclei: checked ones, with the glottal stop after a short vowel, and nuclei with rearticulated vowels, a long vowel with a glottal stop in the middle.

English
In English, the checked vowels are the following:
  as in pit
  as in pet
  as in pat
  as in pot (in varieties without the cot-caught merger or the father–bother merger)
  as in put, foot (in varieties without the FOOT–GOOSE merger)
  as in putt, strut

The proper names Graham and Flaherty are sometimes pronounced with a prevocalic .

The free vowels are the following:
  as in pee
  as in pay
  as in poo
  as in Poe, no 
  as in paw, ball
  as in bra
  as in ply, buy
  as in pow, bow
  as in ploy, boy

The schwa  is usually considered neither free nor checked because it cannot stand in stressed syllables.

In rhotic dialects, they pattern as vowel+consonant sequences, following the historical situation, even though they often surface as rhotacized vowels:  (or, in other analyses, syllabic postalveolar/retroflex approximants:  etc.)

The term checked vowel is also useful in the description of English spelling. In spelling free and checked vowels are often called long and short, based on their historical pronunciation, though nowadays some or all of the free vowels are diphthongs, depending on the dialect, not long vowels as such. Written consonant doubling often shows the vowel is checked; the i of dinner corresponds to checked  because of the double consonants nn; the i of diner corresponds to free  because of the single consonant n. This, however, interferes with the differences in doubling rules between American and British styles of spelling, say travelled versus traveled.

See also
List of phonetics topics
Checked tone of Chinese

References

Vowels
English phonology